The castra of Olteni was a fort in the Roman province of Dacia. It was built in the 2nd century AD. The archaeological site yielded coins issued by the Roman emperors Titus Flavius Vespasianus, Domitian, Trajan,  Antoninus Pius, Elagabal and Alexander Severus. The fort was abandoned in the 3rd century. It ruins are located in Olteni in commune Bodoc in Romania.

See also
List of castra

Notes

Roman Dacia
Archaeological sites in Romania
Roman legionary fortresses in Romania
Ancient history of Transylvania
Historic monuments in Covasna County